Glamourpuss may refer to:

 Glamourpuss (comics), a Canadian independent comic book by Dave Sim
 Glamourpuss (album), an album by Sort Sol
 Glamour Puss, a New Zealand thoroughbred racemare